Spice Islands is an American brand of spices and herbs that began in 1941. The spices are manufactured in Ankeny, Iowa, the largest spice manufacturing facility in the world. The brand is owned by B&G Foods, Inc.

The company's name is taken from the famous "Spice Islands" of Indonesia, aka the Maluku Islands, which are the original home of many famous spices such as nutmeg and cloves.

References

External links

Food and drink companies of the United States
Brand name condiments
Ankeny, Iowa

American companies established in 1941
1941 establishments in the United States
Food manufacturers